Girdler Island is a small island at the south side of Mutton Cove, lying  southwest of Cliff Island and  west of Prospect Point, off the west coast of Graham Land, Antarctica. It was charted and named by the British Graham Land Expedition, 1934–37, under John Rymill.

See also 
 List of Antarctic and sub-Antarctic islands

References

Islands of Graham Land
Graham Coast